Raghuveer Chaudhari is a novelist, poet and critic from Gujarat, India. He has also worked as a columnist for numerous newspapers, such as Sandesh, Janmabhumi, Nirikshaka and Divya Bhaskar. He was a teacher at the Gujarat University until his retirement in 1998. His most significant contributions have been in Gujarati language but he has also written Hindi articles. He received the Sahitya Akademi Award in 1977, for his novel trilogy Uparvas. He received Jnanpith Award, considered to be India's highest literary award, in 2015. In 2019, he was awarded a D.Lit. by Gujarat University.

Raghuveer Chaudhari started his career writing novels and poetry, and later ventured into other forms of literature. He authored more than 80 books and received numerous literary awards. He also served many literary organisations.

Early life
Raghuveer Chaudhari was born on 5 December 1938, in Bapupura village near Gandhinagar, Gujarat, to Dalsinh and Jeeviben, a religious farming couple. He was from Aanjana Chaudhari family. He completed primary and secondary education in Mansa, Gujarat. He received a B.A. in 1960 and M.A. in Hindi language and literature in 1962 from Gujarat University. In 1979, Chaudhari also received a PhD for his Comparative Study of Hindi and Gujarati Verbal Roots at the same university.

He participated in the Navnirman Movement and opposed the Emergency in the 1970s.

Career 

Chaudhari joined the School of Languages in Gujarat University from 1977 and retired as a professor and the head of Department of Hindi in 1998. He served for the executive council of Sahitya Akademi from 1998 to 2002. He was a member of the Press Council of India from 2002 to 2004 and was also appointed a jury member of the 25th Indian Film Festival.

After retirement, he returned to Bapupura and started agricultural activities. He was the president of Gujarati Sahitya Parishad in 2001 and is currently serving as its trustee.

Works
He has written more than eighty books including novels, poetry, plays and literary criticism. He chiefly writes in Gujarati but also occasionally in Hindi.

Novels
His novel Amrita (1965) explores the concept of existentialism. His 1975 trilogy titled Uparvas, Sahwas and Antarvas won him the Sahitya Akademi award in 1977. Rudramahalaya (1978) and Somtirth (1996) are historical novels.

His other novels include Venu Vatsala (1967), Purvarang, Laagni (1976), Samjyaa Vinaa Chhuta Padavun (2003) and Ek Dag Aagal Be Dag Paachhal (2009) and Avaran.

Plays
His Trijo Purush is based on the life of Chandravadan Mehta, a Gujarati author. Sikandar Sani is a historical play while Dim Light is a street play.

Poetry
Tamasa (1965) is an anthology which explores the idea of intelligence over feelings. Another poetry collection is Vaheta Vriksha Pavanma published in 1985.

Other works
Akasmik Sparsh and Gersamaj are collections of short stories. His collections of character sketches are published as Sahaarani Bhavyata and Tilak Kare Raghuvir. Saharani Bhavyata gives sketches of twenty five eminent literary figures like Umashankar Joshi, Jayanti Dalal, Sundaram, Yashavant Shukla, Pravin Joshi, Ravji Patel and many others. He wrote columns in several regional as well as national dailies and journals such as Sandesh, Divya Bhaskar, Janmabhoomi and Nirikshaka.

Recognition

He was awarded the Sahitya Akademi award for his novel trilogy Uparvas in 1977. During 1965 to 1970 he won numerous prizes awarded annually by the State of Gujarat. He received the Ranjitram Suvarna Chandrak in 1975, Kumar Chandrak in 1965 and Munshi award in 1997. In 2001, he won Sahitya Gaurav Puraskar, which he shared with the renowned Gujarati author Ramanlal Joshi. He also received Sauhard Samman from Uttar Pradesh Hindi Sansthaan for contribution to Hindi literature in 1990, Narmad Suvarna Chandrak in 2010, and the Uma-Snehrashmi Prize for 1974-75. He received  Jnanpith Award in 2015. In 2019, he was awarded a D.Lit. by Gujarat University.

See also
 List of Gujarati-language writers

Notes and references

Note

References

External links
 
 

1938 births
Living people
Recipients of the Jnanpith Award
Recipients of the Sahitya Akademi Award in Gujarati
Indian male novelists
Gujarati-language writers
People from Gandhinagar district
Indian male poets
Academic staff of Gujarat University
Gujarati people
Indian literary critics
20th-century Indian novelists
Dramatists and playwrights from Gujarat
20th-century Indian poets
Poets from Gujarat
Novelists from Gujarat
Recipients of the Ranjitram Suvarna Chandrak
20th-century Indian short story writers
Indian historical novelists
20th-century Indian dramatists and playwrights
20th-century Indian male writers
Gujarat University alumni